Eastern was one of the multi-member constituencies of the Althing, the national legislature of Iceland. The constituency was established in 1959 following the nationwide extension of proportional representation for elections to the Althing. It was abolished in 2003 when the constituency was merged into the Northeastern and Southern constituencies following the re-organisation of constituencies across Iceland. Eastern was conterminous with the Eastern region.

Election results

Summary

(Excludes compensatory seats.)

Detailed

1999
Results of the 1999 parliamentary election held on 8 May 1999:

The following candidates were elected:
Arnbjörg Sveinsdóttir (D), 1,892 votes; Einar Már Sigurðarson (S), 1,529 votes; Halldór Ásgrímsson (B), 2,769 votes; Jón Kristjánsson (B), 2,766 votes; and Þuríður Backman (U), 790 votes.

1995
Results of the 1995 parliamentary election held on 8 April 1995:

The following candidates were elected:
Arnbjörg Sveinsdóttir (D), 1,754 votes; Egill Jónsson (D), 1,689 votes; Halldór Ásgrímsson (B), 3,667 votes; Hjörleifur Guttormsson (G), 1,206 votes; and Jón Kristjánsson (B), 3,647 votes.

1991
Results of the 1991 parliamentary election held on 20 April 1991:

The following candidates were elected:
Egill Jónsson (D), 1,617 votes; Gunnlaugur Stefánsson (A), 803 votes; Halldór Ásgrímsson (B), 3,219 votes; Hjörleifur Guttormsson (G), 1,475 votes; and Jón Kristjánsson (B), 3,205 votes.

1987
Results of the 1987 parliamentary election held on 25 April 1987:

The following candidates were elected:
Egill Jónsson (D), 1,289 votes; Halldór Ásgrímsson (B), 3,090 votes; Hjörleifur Guttormsson (G), 1,839 votes; Jón Kristjánsson (B), 3,033 votes; and Sverrir Hermannsson (D), 1,263 votes.

1983
Results of the 1983 parliamentary election held on 23 April 1983:

The following candidates were elected:
Egill Jónsson (D), 1,543 votes; Halldór Ásgrímsson (B), 2,655 votes; Helgi Seljan (G), 2,091 votes; Hjörleifur Guttormsson (G), 1,882 votes; Sverrir Hermannsson (D), 1,714 votes; and Tómas Árnason (B), 2,390 votes.

1979
Results of the 1979 parliamentary election held on 2 and 3 December 1979:

The following candidates were elected:
Egill Jónsson (D), 1,224 votes; Halldór Ásgrímsson (B), 2,666 votes; Helgi Seljan (G), 2,154 votes; Hjörleifur Guttormsson (G), 1,934 votes; Sverrir Hermannsson (D), 1,359 votes; and Tómas Árnason (B), 2,955 votes.

1978
Results of the 1978 parliamentary election held on 25 June 1978:

The following candidates were elected:
Helgi Seljan (G), 2,210 votes; Hjörleifur Guttormsson (G), 1,953 votes; Lúðvík Jósepsson (G), 2,446 votes; Sverrir Hermannsson (D), 1,045 votes; Tómas Árnason (B), 2,171 votes; and Vilhjálmur Hjálmarsson (B), 2,427 votes.

1974
Results of the 1974 parliamentary election held on 30 June 1974:

The following candidates were elected:
Halldór Ásgrímsson (B), 2,150 votes; Helgi Seljan (G), 798 votes; Lúðvík Jósepsson (G), 1,594 votes; Sverrir Hermannsson (D), 1,334 votes; Tómas Árnason (B), 2,388 votes; and Vilhjálmur Hjálmarsson (B), 2,674 votes.

1971
Results of the 1971 parliamentary election held on 13 June 1971:

The following candidates were elected:
Eysteinn Jónsson (B), 2,564 votes; Helgi Seljan (G), 718 votes; Lúðvík Jósepsson (G), 1,435 votes; Páll Þorsteinsson (B), 2,306 votes; Sverrir Hermannsson (D), 1,126 votes; and Vilhjálmur Hjálmarsson (B), 2,051 votes.

1967
Results of the 1967 parliamentary election held on 11 June 1967:

The following candidates were elected:
Eysteinn Jónsson (B), 2,894 votes; Jónas Pétursson (D), 1,185 votes; Lúðvík Jósepsson (G), 1,017 votes; Páll Þorsteinsson (B), 2,605 votes; and Vilhjálmur Hjálmarsson (B), 2,315 votes.

1963
Results of the 1963 parliamentary election held on 9 June 1963:

The following candidates were elected:
Eysteinn Jónsson (B), 2,803 votes; Halldór Ásgrímsson (B), 2,529 votes; Jónas Pétursson (D), 1,101 votes; Lúðvík Jósepsson (G), 905 votes; and Páll Þorsteinsson (B), 2,243 votes.

October 1959
Results of the October 1959 parliamentary election held on 25 and 26 October 1959:

The following candidates were elected:
Eysteinn Jónsson (B), 2,918 votes; Halldór Ásgrímsson (B), 2,627 votes; Jónas Pétursson (D), 1,119 votes; Lúðvík Jósepsson (G), 989 votes; and Páll Þorsteinsson (B), 2,335 votes.

References

1959 establishments in Iceland
2003 disestablishments in Iceland
Constituencies established in 1959
Constituencies disestablished in 2003
Althing constituency
Former Althing constituencies